Alia Ouabdelsselam (born 20 April 1978) is a French former competitive ice dancer. She competed for most of her career with Benjamin Delmas. They teamed up in 1997 and split in 2002. During their career, they won the 2002 French Figure Skating Championships and placed as high as 13th at the European Figure Skating Championships.

Before teaming up with Delmas, Ouabdelsselam competed with Luc Monéger.

Programs 
(with Delmas)

Results
GP: Grand Prix

With Delmas

With Monéger

References

External links
 
 Official site 
 Alia Ouabdelsselam / Benjamin Delmas at Tracings.net

French female ice dancers
1978 births
Living people
People from Antony, Hauts-de-Seine
Sportspeople from Hauts-de-Seine